The Alliterative Morte Arthure is a 4346-line Middle English alliterative poem, retelling the latter part of the legend of King Arthur. Dating from about 1400, it is preserved in a single copy in the early 15th-century Lincoln Thornton Manuscript, now in Lincoln Cathedral Library.

History
The author of the poem is unknown. In his history of Scotland, Andrew of Wyntoun mentions a poet called Huchoun ("little Hugh"), who he says made a "gret Gest of Arthure, / And þe Awntyr of Gawane, / Þe Pistil als of Suet Susane" [great history of Arthur, / And the Adventure of Gawain, / The Epistle also of Sweet Susan]. This "Gest of Arthure" has been claimed to be a reference to what is now known as the Alliterative Morte Arthure; but the fact that the Morte Arthure seems to have been written in an East Midlands dialect, the fact that Huchoun may have been Scottish, and the dialect of the extant Epistle of Sweet Susan, which appears to be that of North Yorkshire, all argue against "Huchoun"'s authorship.

The only manuscript source for the Morte Arthure is the Lincoln Thornton Manuscript written sometime in the mid-15th century by Robert Thornton, who copied an older text, now lost, which presumably derived from south-west Lincolnshire.

Contents
The story is adapted from books IX and X of Geoffrey of Monmouth's History of the Kings of Britain. It contains numerous episodes which are not in Geoffrey's work such as the Round Table and suggests the poet using other works such as Wace's Roman de Brut or Layamon's Brut, the first texts to mention the Round Table. Some parts do not have a clear source and may have originated with the poet.

Compared to many of the other depictions of Arthur's story, the Alliterative Morte Arthure is a relatively realistic version of events. There are few of the fantastical elements which often surround the legend and the story focuses more on Arthur's skill as a warrior king. The stress placed on chivalric duty in the contemporary Sir Gawain and the Green Knight is in the Morte Arthure of a more practical nature and has more to do with personal loyalty. Also the Morte Arthure is less clearly part of the romance genre than Sir Gawain and other Arthurian poems and more like a chronicle of the times. It contains little of the magic and symbolism of these other works, with no mention of Merlin, although it does use the literary device of the dream vision common in courtly romance and Chaucer. (In this case, however, the dream vision of a dragon (representing Arthur) fighting a monster is more clearly derived from the Dream of Mordecai in one of the longer Greek versions of the Book of Esther.) Arthur is a more political and also flawed ruler, the story is not just based in a small realm but is always placed within a wider European situation and this Arthur is more clearly Christian than other versions. Arthur also has two legendary swords, the first being Excalibur (referred to as Caliburn, an earlier name of the sword), and the second one being Clarent, a formal sword, stolen by Mordred, with which Arthur receives his fatal blow close to the banks of the Tamar.

An example of the differing style of the alliterative version of the story is the treatment of Mordred. He is not simply the villain of the piece as he is in other poems but is a complex character with a varying personality. One mark of the prevalence of Christian morality in the poem is that even Mordred cries and seems to be repentant around line 3886. The Alliterative Morte is “more interested in the fates of men than of armies,” and even Arthur himself transforms from a “prudent and virtuous king to cruel reckless tyrant.” The work's perspective is more critical of war in general than most Arthurian legends, showing mixed reactions toward the "pitiless genocides" surrounding the tale.

Rather than an end rhyme, the Alliterative uses alliteration on metrical stresses, such as the “grete glorious God through grace of Himselven” (li 4) and a parataxis style of short, simple sentences similar to those seen in Iliad and Beowulf.

Although the majority of Thomas Malory's Le Morte d'Arthur is closer to the style of Gawain and French versions of the legend, the second part of Malory's work, King Arthur's war against the Romans, is primarily a translation of the earlier alliterative work, although Malory alters the tragic ending of the Alliterative Morte Arthure into a triumphant ending. Malory's contextualization of this tale early in his collection of Arthurian tales seems to indicate Arthur's heroic potential which will deepen the irony of his eventual fall through his own pride, and the wrath and lust that are allowed to run rampant in his court.

References

External links
The Stanzaic Morte Arthur and Alliterative Morte Arthure from TEAMS Middle English Texts
"Turn, traitor untrew: Altering Arthur and Mordred in the Alliterative Morte Arthure", a discussion of the changes in character Arthur and Mordred go through
 Alliterative Morte Arthure translated and retold in modern English alliterative prose, from Lincoln Cathedral MS 91, the Lincoln Thornton Manuscript

14th-century books
14th-century poems
Arthurian literature in Middle English
Middle English poems
Romance (genre)